Liu He may refer to:

Marquis of Haihun (died 59 BC), personal name Liu He, emperor of the Han dynasty for 27 days in 74 BC
Liu He (Han Zhao) (died 310), emperor of the Chinese/Xiongnu state Han Zhao in 310
Liu He (politician) (born 1952), Vice Premier of China

See also
Liuhe (disambiguation)